Vinh Medical University was founded on 13 July 2010 under the Decision no. 1077/2010/QĐ-TTg by the Vice Prime Minister of Vietnam Nguyen Thien Nhan. The university was established based on the Nghe An Medical College, 2003. The university provides healthcare personnel, which includes physician, nurse, assistant pharmacist, for the North Central Coast region of Vietnam and   neighborhood areas. The university also help training healthcare personnel for several provinces of Lao People's Democratic Republic, such as Bolikhamsai, Xiangkhouang, Luang Prabang, Houaphanh.

History

1960-2002
At first, the school mostly provided healthcare personnel in diploma level with two years training. The graduation titles included assistant doctor, assistant nurse, medical technician, and primary pharmacist. The first established name was Nghe An Assistant Doctor School. At this time, Doctor Tran Ngoc Dang, the Deputy Chief of Nghe An Health Service was assigned as the 1st rector of the school. It was under management by the Ministry of Health, and its first location at Hung Dong commune, Vinh city. Number of full-time lecturers at this time including 10 persons appointed from Ministry of Health. The part-time were the assistant doctors or doctors of Hospital A1 (the name of Nghe An General Hospital at that time) and the hospital of Army Medical Corps No 4. The student flow was about six hundred at this time, and after graduating, the graduated would be assigned by the Ministry of Health to work for the whole army zone 4.

In 1964, Dr Tran Ngoc Dang was assigned to work at the Central Committee for South Vietnam. Mr. Nguyen Van Thanh, the Deputy Chief of Nghe An Labor Department was assigned to be the rector, the college became under the provincial control and renamed as Nghe An Health Worker Training School.

2003-2010
The school was upgraded onto College level which had been training health care profession in collegial level with three years curriculum.

2010-present

References
 

Universities in Vietnam
Educational institutions established in 2010
2010 establishments in Vietnam